Declaration of Dependence is the third album from Norwegian duo Kings of Convenience, their first album in five years. It was released on 5 October 2009. "Mrs Cold" and "Boat Behind" have been released as radio singles in some countries.

The album was pre-released on 21 September for Spotify premium subscribers. It was released in selected countries (such as Poland) on 28 September 2009.

Critical reception 

Declaration of Dependence received mostly positive reviews from contemporary music critics. At Metacritic, which assigns a normalized rating out of 100 to reviews from mainstream critics, the album received an average score of 65, based on 18 reviews, which indicates "generally favorable reviews".

Track listing

Personnel 
Kings of Convenience
 Erlend Øye – lead (2), co-lead (1, 4, 5, 8, 11, 12) and backing (3, 6, 9, 10, 13) vocals, steel (1, 3, 4, 5, 6, 7, 9, 10, 11, 13) and nylon (2, 8, 12) string guitar
 Eirik Glambek Bøe – lead (3, 6, 7, 9, 10, 13), co-lead (1, 4, 5, 8, 11, 12) and backing (2) vocals, nylon (1, 3, 4, 5, 6, 7, 9, 10, 11, 13) and steel (2, 8, 12) string guitar, piano (3)

Additional personnel
 Davide Bertolini – upright bass (2, 4, 6, 9)
 Tobias Hett – viola (2, 4, 9)

Certifications

References 

Kings of Convenience albums
2009 albums